In military terms, 5th Division may refer to:

Infantry divisions
5th Division (Australia)
5th Division (People's Republic of China)
5th Division (Colombia)
Finnish 5th Division (Continuation War)
5th Light Cavalry Division (France)
5th Motorized Division (France)
5th North African Infantry Division, France
5th Division (German Empire)
5th Division (Reichswehr)
5th Jäger Division (Wehrmacht)
5th Royal Bavarian Division, German Empire
5th Mountain Division (Wehrmacht)
5th Infantry Division (Greece)
5th Division (Imperial Japanese Army)
5th (Mhow) Division, British Indian Army
5th Infantry Division (India)
5th  Alpine Division Pusteria, Italy
5th Infantry Division Cosseria, Italy
5th Division (New Zealand)
5th Division (North Korea)
5th Division (Iraq)
5th Division (Norway), participated in the Norwegian Campaign
5th Infantry Division (Ottoman Empire)
5th Infantry Division (Philippines)
5th Infantry Division (Poland)
5th Rifle Division (Poland)
5th Infantry Division (Russian Empire)
5th Infantry Division (South Korea)
5th Division (South Vietnam)
5th Rifle Division (Soviet Union)
5th Division (Spain)
5th Infantry Division (Thailand)
5th Infantry Division (United Kingdom)
5th Infantry Division (United States)
5th Marine Division (United States)
5th Infantry Division (Vietnam)

Cavalry divisions
5th Cavalry Division (German Empire)
21st Panzer Division (Wehrmacht)
2nd Indian Cavalry Division, designated 5th Cavalry Division from November 1916 to March 1918 in France in World War I
5th Cavalry Division (India), served from July 1918 in Palestine in World War I

Armored divisions
5th Canadian Division
5th Armored Division (France)
5th SS Panzer Division Wiking, Germany
5th Armored Division (United States)
5th Armoured Division (Syria)
5th Panzer Division (Bundeswehr)

Aviation divisions
5th Air Division, United States

Naval divisions
Fifth Carrier Division, Imperial Japanese Navy

See also
5th Group (disambiguation)
5th Brigade (disambiguation)
5th Regiment (disambiguation)
5th Squadron (disambiguation)